The Eastern Range is a U.S. rocket range on the east coast of Florida.

Eastern Range or variation, may also refer to:

 Eastern Ranges, an Australian-rules football team in the state of Victoria, Australia.
 Eastern Range mine, Pilbara region, Western Australia, Australia; an iron ore mine named "Eastern Range"
 Eastern Range (Kamchatka), Russia; a mountain range
 Great Eastern Ranges, a cordillera in eastern Australia, extending from Victoria to Queensland

See also

 
 
 
 Cordillera Oriental (disambiguation) aka "Eastern Range"
 Western Range (disambiguation)
 Eastern (disambiguation)
 Range (disambiguation)